Cleo at Carnegie: The 10th Anniversary Concert is a live album by Cleo Laine, recorded at Carnegie Hall and released in April 1983 through RCA Records. The album earned Laine a Grammy Award for Best Jazz Vocal Performance, Female. John Dankworth was the arranger.

Track listing

Side one
"Any Place I Hang My Head"
"It's a Grand Night for Singing"
"Good Morning"
"It's a Lovely Day Today"
"I'm Shadowing You"
"Crazy Rhythm"
"Primrose Color Blue"

Side two
"We Are the Music Makers"
"You Spotted Snakes"
"Methuselah"
"When I Was One and Twenty"
"Sing Me No Song"
"Triboro' Fair"

Side three
"You've Got To Do What You've Got To Do"
"He Was Beautiful"
"Turkish Delight"
"Never Let Me Go"

Side four
Hoagy Carmichael Medley
"Georgia on My Mind"
"Lazy Bones"
"The Nearness of You"
"I Get Along Without You Very Well"
"My Resistance Is Low"
"Stardust"
"I Want to Be Happy"

References

1983 live albums
Albums recorded at Carnegie Hall
Cleo Laine albums
Grammy Award for Best Jazz Vocal Performance, Female
RCA Records live albums